The eighth wave of Walt Disney Treasures was released on November 11, 2008 (Veterans Day).

The wave itself was originally going to include a release dedicated to Destino, a short film part of Fantasia 2000 that was once scheduled to be released as a set for the Walt Disney's Legacy Collection series, however, the release was cancelled in both ocassions and was replaced by the Mickey Mouse Club Presents: Annette set.

The Chronological Donald, Volume Four

This set is the final volume on Donald and contains the remaining Donald shorts and featurettes from 1951-1961. However, this set omits three Chip 'n' Dale solo shorts. It also omits Donald's Fire Survival Plan and Steel and America (1965) educational featurettes, as well as the 1967 educational featurette Scrooge McDuck and Money, which featured Uncle Scrooge for the first time in a starring role in animation. He had previously only appeared in the opening title sequence of The Mickey Mouse Club.

The cartoon Bee on Guard is missing the last 5 seconds of footage for reasons unknown. A few months after its release Disney issued replacement discs correcting this error.

39,500 sets produced.

Disc one
1951
 Dude Duck
 Corn Chips
 Test Pilot Donald
 Lucky Number
 Out of Scale
 Bee on Guard

1952
 Donald Applecore
 Let's Stick Together
 Trick or Treat

1953
 Don's Fountain of Youth
 The New Neighbor
 Working for Peanuts
 Canvas Back Duck

From the Vault
 Uncle Donald's Ants (1952)
 Rugged Bear (1953)

Disc two
1954
 Donald's Diary
 Dragon Around
 Grin and Bear It
 The Flying Squirrel
 Grand Canyonscope

1955
 Bearly Asleep
 Beezy Bear
 Up a Tree

1956
 Chips Ahoy
 How to Have an Accident In the Home

1959
 Donald in Mathmagic Land

1961
 Donald and the Wheel
 The Litterbug

From the Vault
 Spare the Rod (1954)
 No Hunting (1955)
 How to Have An Accident at Work (1959)

Bonus Features
 "Donald Goes to Press"
 "The Unseen Donald Duck: Trouble Shooters" (1946)
 Leonard Maltin and Jerry Beck audio commentaries on 2 shorts
 10 Mickey Mouse Works cartoons (1999-2000)
 Bird Brained Donald
 Donald and the Big Nut
 Donald's Charmed Date
 Donald's Dinner Date
 Donald's Failed Fourth
 Donald's Rocket Ruckus
 Donald's Shell Shots
 Donald's Valentine Dollar
 Music Store Donald
 Survival of the Woodchucks

Dr. Syn: The Scarecrow of Romney Marsh

39,500 sets produced.

Disc one
 The Scarecrow of Romney Marsh: Part 1
First broadcast: February 9, 1964
 The Scarecrow of Romney Marsh: Part 2
First broadcast: February 16, 1964
 The Scarecrow of Romney Marsh: Part 3
First broadcast: February 23, 1964

Disc two
 Dr. Syn, Alias The Scarecrow: Feature-length version released in movie theaters in the United Kingdom on December 12, 1963

The Mickey Mouse Club Presents: Annette

39,500 sets produced.

Disc one
 Episodes 1–10 first broadcast February 10-February 21, 1958

Disc two
 Episodes 11–20 first broadcast February 24-March 7, 1958

Bonus features
 Two bonus Mickey Mouse Club episodes
 Musically Yours, Annette
 To Annette With Love

References

External links
 waltdisneytreasures.com

8